William Alexander Cameron (December 5, 1896 – January 28, 1972) was a Canadian professional ice hockey right winger who played two seasons in the National Hockey League for the Montreal Canadiens and New York Americans between 1923 and 1925. Born in Timmins, Ontario, Cameron won the Stanley Cup in 1924 with the Canadiens.

Career statistics

Regular season and playoffs

References

External links
 

1896 births
1972 deaths
Buffalo Bisons (IHL) players
Canadian ice hockey right wingers
Hamilton Tigers (IHL) players
Ice hockey people from Ontario
Kitchener Millionaires players
Montreal Canadiens players
New York Americans players
Pittsburgh Athletic Association ice hockey players
Sportspeople from Timmins
Stanley Cup champions
St. Paul Saints (AHA) players
Toronto Millionaires players